The Saint Lucia national football team represents Saint Lucia in international football under the control of the Saint Lucia Football Association (SLFA). Although a Saint Lucia representative team had played previously, the football association was founded in 1979. It became fully affiliated to CONCACAF in 1986 and joined FIFA two years later.

The following list contains all results of Saint Lucia's official matches since 1979.

Official results

2001

2002

2003

2004

2006

2008

2010

2011

2012

2013

2014

2015

2017

2018

2019

2022

2023

References

External links
 SLFA Official Website
 Soccerway list of matches
 National Football Teams list of matches
 ELO list of matches
 RSSSF list of matches
 International Football list of matches

results